Lidingöbanan is a Light-railway line in Stockholm, Sweden, between Ropsten and Gåshaga brygga, serving the southern half of Lidingö island.

The Lidingöbanan has its origins in the Stockholm-Södra Lidingöns Järnväg (Stockholm-Southern Lidingö Railway), proposed by inventor Gustaf Dalén, opened for traffic 1914. It got ferry-less access to Stockholm when the Lidingö bridge was opened 1925. Public transportation on Lidingöbanan has always been provided using tram cars, but in the past Lidingöbanan also carried goods traffic. At its largest, Lidingöbanan extended to Humlegården in Stockholm through Stockholms Spårvägar's tramway network, with access to the Värtabanan freight railway track. There was also traffic on a track on the north side of Lidingö island which terminated at Kyrkviken, but that section closed in 1971. Lidingö town centre is now accessible only by bus. Lidingöbanan formally became part of SL's public transportation network in 1972.

Lidingöbanan was legally a railway until 31 March 2009, when it was reclassified by the Swedish railway inspectorate (Järnvägsstyrelsen). Freight train traffic existed 1925–1982. Passenger service has, however, always been provided by tramcars, which prior to 1967 continued onto the streets of Stockholm, as mentioned above. The electrical infrastructure (overhead wire) is of tram type.

Until recently the rolling stock consisted of Type A30/A30B and B30/B30B manoeuver trams, all over fifty years old, and dating from the period (1940s–50s) when the Stockholm Metro was only partially completed and these areas were served by trams, adapted for faster two-way traffic.

The line was closed between the summer of 2013 and October 2015 for engineering works, modernisation and installation of new equipment, with rail replacement buses running during that period. When reopened parts of the single track line had been converted to double track, and new Type A36 trams were introduced, along with a new signalling system.

Lines
Lidingöbanan has a single line with thirteen stations, from Ropsten in northeast Stockholm to Gåshaga brygga in southeastern Lidingö. At Ropsten there is an interchange with the Stockholm Metro Red Line 13, and a Waxholmsbolaget archipelago boat terminal at Gåshaga brygga.

There are plans to connect the line with the Spårväg City line in central Stockholm.

See also 

Trams in Stockholm
Public transport in Stockholm
List of tram and light rail transit systems

References

External links 

 2021 Simplified map of Lidingöbanan line (pdf)
 2021 Map of all SL Rail Lines (tram lines included) (pdf)
 Storstockholms Lokaltrafik (Stockholm Transport) - official site 
 Storstockholms Lokaltrafik (Stockholm Transport) - official site 
 Järnväg.net - Lidingöbanan 

Rail transport in Stockholm
Light rail in Sweden
Railway lines in Sweden
Tram transport in Sweden
Railway lines opened in 1914
1914 establishments in Sweden